The Sheldon Coin Grading Scale is a 70-point coin grading scale used in the numismatic assessment of a coin's quality. The American Numismatic Association based its Official ANA Grading Standards in large part on the Sheldon scale. The scale was created by William Herbert Sheldon.

Original Sheldon Scale (1949)

In 1949, the original scale was first presented in "Dr. William H. Sheldon's Early American Cents" titled "A Quantitative Scale for condition" as a way to grade Large cents.  The scale is known today as the Sheldon scale.

Adapted scale (1970s–present)

By 1953 the original Sheldon scale had become outdated.  It was not until the 1970s, however, that the ANA chose to adapt the scale for use on all US coins. The scale used today is a modification of the original Sheldon scale, with added adjustments, additions, deletions, and modifications to it.

Note: Some early American coin varieties are almost always found to be weakly struck in places. This does not bring the grade of these coins down as in some cases no flawless coin exists for the variety. Early coins in general usually have planchet quality issues which depending on severity and market conditions can bring the grade down for other coins.

Circulated grades

Uncirculated grades

Mint State refers to a coin minted for regular distribution that was never actually put into circulation, i.e., it was never used for daily commerce; it is uncirculated. Since individuals never used these coins to purchase goods or services, the coins were not handed from one person to another; they were not jumbled up with other coins in pockets or purses; and they were not repeatedly counted—and touched—by retailers and bank personnel. Consequently, uncirculated coins should not show signs of wear.

In modern-day United States numismatics, collectors, coin dealers, and third-party grading services grade mint state coins using a number from 60 to 70 inclusive, with 70 representing a perfect coin with no visible blemishes. Coins in the lower grade range (60-63), are usually unworn, and may suffer from weak striking, bag marks and other defects that make them less attractive to the collector. Some Mint State early coins appear to be circulated due to weak strikes, die cracks, planchet problems, or metal quality. There are a few United States coins for which no mint state specimens exist, such as the 1792 silver dime, and the 1802 Draped Bust (Heraldic Eagle reverse) silver half dime.

Adjectival grades for uncirculated coins
Coin dealers and individual coin collectors often use adjectives—with or without an accompanying Sheldon numerical grade—to describe an uncirculated coin's grade. The term Brilliant Uncirculated (often abbreviated as BU) is probably the most common—and the most ambiguous—of such adjectives. While Brilliant Uncirculated (BU) ought to refer to an uncirculated coin that retains its original mint luster, some equate BU with Uncirculated, i.e., they might refer to an MS-60 coin with little or no effulgence (brightness) as Brilliant Uncirculated. Along these lines, some numismatists argue that an unscrupulous subset of coin dealers mislead customers by using adjectival grades without defining their terms. At the same time, there appears to be at least some consensus in the numismatic community for the following definitions.

However, bear in mind that if a coin dealer advertises a coin as "Gem Uncirculated", it does not necessarily mean that a third-party coin grading company would assign an MS-65 or MS-66 grade to the coin.

Numerical grades for uncirculated coins

Proof coins

Like circulated grades, proof coins are graded on the Sheldon scale from 1 to 70, and are preceded by the abbreviation ‘PF’ or ‘PR’ to distinguish them from circulation strikes. Proof coins graded 60 to 70 are mirrored to those of Uncirculated grades with the difference that the coin was not made for circulation. Proof coins with the grade of PR-63 are sometimes called "Choice Proofs". Proof coins that are below the grade of 60 and show signs of circulation or mishandling have been classified as Impaired Proofs, these are not included alongside circulated coins as they were never issued or intended for circulation in the first place.

Detracting coins
The following table shows coins that have detracting features. Coin dealers will normally grade these coins at or below the ones shown for that respective type, the grades here depend on how bad the issue or issues are. Grading services typically label these coins as "authentic" with x grade "details" (ex: "EF details"). Coins that are uncirculated as mentioned above can not go below an MS-60 grade.

Notes

References

Coin grading